Yehudit Kafri Meiri (born 1935) is a 20th–21st century Israeli poet and a writer, as well as editor and translator.

Biography
She was born in 1935 and lived as a child in Kibbutz Ein HaHoresh, where her parents were founding members. Yehudit belonged to the first group of children born in this kibbutz.

After she got married, she moved to Kibbutz Sasa, where she wrote her first book, The Time Will Have Mercy (Hebrew: הזמן ירחם), which was published in 1962, one year after she moved to Kibbutz Shoval with her family. In Kibbutz Shoval she published a few more poetry books and children's books and made her first attempt at writing prose including a book describing her childhood memories, All The Summer We Went Barefoot (Hebrew: כל הקיץ הלכנו יחפים), which was successful and sold several editions.

Yehudit Kafri, mother of three and grandmother of four, has lived since 1989 with her husband in Mazkeret Batya, where she continues to write and publish books of poetry and biographies. In 2003 she published an historical biographic novel, Zosha from the Jezreel Valley to the Red Orchestra, which tells the life story of Zosha Poznanska, who was a member of the Red Orchestra and eventually killed by the Gestapo. This novel won The Best Literary Achievement of the Year Prize in Israel. It has since been translated and published in English, and in Polish, and lately in French.

Bibliography
Poems by Yehudit Kafri were published in Hebrew, Arabic, English, Spanish, Croatian and Russian. Kafri has won several literary prizes including the Prime Minister's prize in 1987, and other scholarship prizes. Here are the judges reasons for handing out the prize for Zosha: 

Following careful and extensive research, the author is displaying exceptional courage as she copes with the main character, a heroine in the true classical sense. The author developed an intricate and gentle relationship with Zosha a member of the "Red Orchestra", whose life story she set out to tell. Using precise and reserved language Kafri records this relationship while keeping intellectual and emotional levels within appropriate boundaries vis-à-vis the horrific historical events she describes. Zosha is a historical novel bringing successfully the individual and emotional stories of the characters in the face of the larger story of the era. Kafri published 9 poetry books and 9 others (children's books, biographies, and prose).

Poetry
Time Will Have Mercy, Makhbarot Lesifrut, 1962
The spur of this moment, Sifriat Poalim, 1966
From Here and From Another Country, S.P. 1970
Small Variations, Hakibbutz Hameuchad, 1975 
Woman With Parasol, Gvanim, 1997
Koranit, S.P. 1982
Awn of Summer, S.P. 1988
Man Woman Bird, Iaron Golan, 1993
Zosha\Poems, Iton 77, 2006

Prose
Mula Agin (Biography), Kibbutz Shoval, 1969
To Love a bleu Whale (non fiction), Sifriat Poalim, 1982 
Avraham Zakai (Biography), the family, 1995
All Summer We Walked Barefoot (memoir), Shdemot-Tag, 1996
Sheindl (Biography), the family, 1997
Zosha – From the Jezreel Valley to the Red Orchestra, Keter, 2003
Yonatan, What will come of you! - The family, 2009

Children
It was During Vacation (musicale for children), Sifriat Poalim, 1974
Our Champion Tom, Sifriat Poalim, 1987

Translation
For Sifriat Poalim Publishing House – 14 psychological books. Among them: The Dynamic of Creation, by Anthony Storr (1972), 1983

Editing
For Sifriat Poalim and others – 12 books. Among them: Border Crossing – Poems from the Lebanon War, 1983

External links 

1935 births
Living people
Hebrew-language poets
Israeli women poets
Israeli poets
People from Shoval
Recipients of Prime Minister's Prize for Hebrew Literary Works